is a fictional monster, or kaiju, originating from a series of Japanese films. Debuting in the 1965 film Gamera, the Giant Monster, the character and the first film were intended to compete with the success of Toho's Godzilla film series. Since then, Gamera has become a Japanese icon in his own right, appearing in a total of 12 films produced by Daiei Film and later Kadokawa Daiei Studio, and various media. 

Gamera is depicted as a giant, fire-breathing, prehistoric turtle monster, mutated by exposure to nuclear weapons. In the first film, Gamera is portrayed as aggressive and destructive, though he also saves a child. As the films progressed, Gamera took on a more benevolent role, becoming a protector of humanity, and especially children, from extraterrestrial races and other giant monsters.

To date, Gamera, the Giant Monster is the only film to be released theatrically in the United States; however, it was heavily localized and retitled Gammera the Invincible. In the United States, Gamera attained prominence during the 1970s due to the burgeoning popularity of UHF television stations featuring Saturday afternoon matinée showcases such as Creature Double Feature, and later in the 1990s when five Gamera films were featured on the television series Mystery Science Theater 3000.

Overview

Conception

The original idea for Gamera was developed by Yonejiro Saito, Masaichi Nagata, Hidemasa Nagata, and Noriaki Yuasa. The character was created as a property of the production company Daiei Film, and was intended to compete with the Godzilla film series (featuring the giant monster character of the same name), owned by rival studio Toho. Gamera has been described as being a rip-off of Godzilla.

The name  derives from the Japanese kame ("turtle"), and the suffix -ra, a suffix shared by such other kaiju characters as Godzilla (Gojira) and Mothra. Gamera's name was spelled Gammera in the title of Gammera the Invincible, the re-titled American release of the first film in the franchise, Gamera, the Giant Monster.

Gamera's turtle-like design may have been inspired by the Black Tortoise, one of the Four Symbols of the Chinese constellations in East Asian mythology. The Black Tortoise is known as Genbu in Japanese, and is usually depicted as a turtle entwined together with a snake. Each of the Four Symbols are said to act as guardians over each of the four cardinal directions, with the dragon Seiryu in the east; the tiger Byakko in the west; the bird Suzaku in the south; and the tortoise Genbu in the north. In Gamera, the Giant Monster, the first film in the franchise, Gamera is depicted as awakening in the Arctic, the northernmost region on Earth. Gamera 3: Revenge of Iris, the 11th film in the franchise, contains a scene featuring a book describing the Four Symbols, including Genbu.

Characteristics
Gamera resembles an enormous prehistoric turtle, and is capable of both bipedal movement and flight. He occasionally walks on all four legs in the first three films of the Gamera franchise. He can fly by means of "jets" which can be ignited out of his limb holes when he retracts his legs into his shell. The jets allow Gamera to rise into the air and spin, propelling him forward. In later films, he is shown to be able to fly with only his rear legs drawn inside his shell, allowing his front limbs more freedom. Gamera's shell is presented as being incredibly resilient and strong, and can deflect missiles and other projectiles. His plastron (lower shell) is more vulnerable than his carapace (upper shell), however, and he has been wounded in his plastron to the point of bleeding. He possesses a pronounced crest on his head, his mouth contains rows of teeth, and two tusks protrude upward from each side of his lower jaw.

During the franchise's Shōwa period, Gamera is depicted as feeding on flammable substances, such as oil and fire. According to notes by frequent series director Noriaki Yuasa, Gamera's internal anatomy includes sacs which allow him to store oil, lava, coal, and uranium. In Gamera, the Giant Monster and Gamera vs. Barugon, cold temperatures are shown to weaken Gamera. During the franchise's Heisei period, Gamera has retractable claws protruding from his elbows, and is shown to be able to shoot plasma fireballs from his mouth. Gamera has also been portrayed as being able to absorb mana from the Earth, to fire a plasma beam from his chest, and to regenerate lost limbs.

The original 1965 film, Gamera, the Giant Monster, depicts Gamera's origins as being a result of United States military fighters launching an attack on enemy bombers (presumably belonging to the Soviet Union), which causes the detonation of an atomic bomb on board one of the aircraft. The nuclear blast releases Gamera from a state of suspended animation in the ice. Meanwhile, a Japanese research team stumbles upon an Inuit tribe in possession of an ancient stone etching that depicts a giant turtle, which the tribe refers to as "Gamera".

In the franchise's Heisei era, which began with the 1995 reboot film Gamera: Guardian of the Universe, Gamera's in-universe origins were changed. In the Heisei films, Gamera is portrayed as an ancient, bio-engineered creature from Atlantis, created for the purpose of defending the people of Atlantis from Gyaos, a bat-like creature which breathes a destructive supersonic beam when on the attack. Human researchers find Gamera floating in the Pacific Ocean, encased in rock, and mistake him for an atoll. Within the rock, they discover a large monolith explaining Gamera's origins, along with dozens of magatama made from orichalcum, which allow for a psychic link between Gamera and humans. In Gamera 3: Revenge of Iris, an undersea graveyard containing numerous Gamera-like fossils is shown, suggesting that Gamera was not the only one of his kind. One character in the film refers to these fossils as "beta versions" of Gamera, possibly failures in Atlantis' attempts to create the final version.

The continuity of the franchise was rebooted a second time with the 2006 film Gamera the Brave, the 12th entry in the series. The opening scene of the film, set in 1973, depicts the original Gamera sacrificing himself by means of self-destruction to save a coastal village from three Gyaos. 33 years later, a young boy named Toru Aizawa finds a glowing, heart-shaped rock near his home, with a small egg lying on top of it. A baby turtle hatches from the egg, and begins to grow in size at an alarming rate. The turtle, dubbed "Toto" by Toru, quickly forms a bond with the boy and develops the ability to breathe fire and fly. After consuming the glowing rock found with his egg, Toto fully transforms into the next incarnation of Gamera, gaining the power to defeat a lizard-like monster known as Zedus.

History
The Gamera film series is broken into two different eras, each reflecting a characteristic style and corresponding to the same eras used to classify all kaiju eiga (monster movies) in Japan. The names of the two eras refer to the Japanese emperor during production: the Shōwa era and the Heisei era.

Shōwa era (1965–1980)
The film series began in 1965 with Gamera, the Giant Monster, directed by Noriaki Yuasa, which is the first and only entry in the entire series to be shot in black-and-white. In 1966, the film was released theatrically in the United States under the title Gammera the Invincible. A total of seven Gamera films were produced between 1965 and 1971, with one being released in Japan each year. These films, several of which were also directed by Yuasa, became popular with child audiences. During this time, five of the seven films were picked up for television distribution in the United States by American International Television. Just as Gamera, the Giant Monster becoming Gammera the Invincible, each film (except for Gamera vs. Zigra) was dubbed into English and re-titled for American viewers—Gamera vs. Barugon became War of the Monsters; Gamera vs. Gyaos became Return of the Giant Monsters; Gamera vs. Viras became Destroy All Planets; Gamera vs. Guiron became Attack of the Monsters; and Gamera vs. Jiger became Gamera vs. Monster X.

Despite several sources stating that a monster called Garasharp was to appear in the eighth entry in the Gamera series slated for a 1972 release, director Noriaki Yuasa stated that Garasharp was created specifically for the short film Gamera vs. Garasharp featured on the 1991 LD set, Gamera Permanent Preservation Plan, and that a new two-headed monster was planned for the next film, which was canceled because Daiei Film went into bankruptcy in 1971 and the Gamera films were forced to cease production as a result.

After Daiei was purchased by Tokuma Shoten in 1974, the new management wanted to produce another Gamera film, resulting in Gamera: Super Monster (also known as Space Monster Gamera), released in 1980. The filmmakers were forced to make the movie because of the contract for one more Gamera film that they owed to Daiei. Approximately one-third of Gamera: Super Monster is composed of stock footage from six of the previous seven films. Yuasa had Takahashi end the film by having Gamera be killed by sacrificing his life to save Earth.

In 1985, the American distribution rights to the Gamera films were bought by producer Sandy Frank, who distributed five of the eight films with new English dubbing. In 1988 and 1989, Frank's versions of Gamera, the Giant Monster (simply re-titled Gamera), Gamera vs. Barugon, Gamera vs. Gyaos (re-titled Gamera vs. Gaos), Gamera vs. Guiron, and  Gamera vs. Zigra were each used in episodes of the television program Mystery Science Theater 3000, during the show's first season, which aired on KTMA-TV.

Heisei era (1995–2015)

In the 1995 series reboot, Gamera: Guardian of the Universe, three Gyaos are discovered on a remote island. The Japanese government discovers that they are all female and decides that since they are the last of their kind, they should be captured and studied. Meanwhile, a search has been assembled for a moving atoll in the Pacific. They find it, along with small gems made of an unknown metal and a stone sticking up out of the center of it. They manage to take pictures and collect some of the strange gems, but the stone crumbles and the atoll takes off towards Japan at high speeds. It ends up that the atoll is actually an ancient monster, made by the Atlanteans, called Gamera. He attacks the Gyaos, killing two, but one escapes. The remaining Gyaos grows to Gamera-like proportions and the two battle. Gamera manages to defeat his foe and heads out to sea.

In Gamera 2: Attack of Legion, released in 1996, Earth is attacked by an alien force known as Legion. In Gamera 3: Revenge of Iris, released in 1999, Gamera has to face hordes of Gyaos and a new foe known as Iris. In Gamera the Brave, released in 2006, Gamera battles Gyaos and Zedus. This was the 12th and most recent movie in the franchise.

In March 2014, Anime News Network reported that a new Gamera production was planned, with no release date specified. On October 8, 2015, at the New York Comic Con, Kadokawa Daiei Studio's senior managing director Tsuyoshi Kikuchi and producer Shinichiro Inoue screened a full proof-of-concept film in honor of the franchise's 50th anniversary, the short was directed by Katsuhito Ishii. The proof-of-concept film featured a newly designed Gamera, a swarm of newly designed Gyaos and a new, as yet unnamed monster, all of which were created and rendered through the use of computer-generated imagery. It has been rumored since the film's release at New York Comic Con that it was never completed. However, the film's official website and an interview with the director both state that it was only a short proof of concept film.

Reiwa era (2023) 
On November 16, 2022, Kadokawa announced plans for a new Gamera production, entitled Gamera -Rebirth-, which will be released globally on Netflix. Shusuke Kaneko, director of the Heisei Gamera trilogy, had proposed an idea for a new film. However, Kadokawa had already proceeded with their new project by the time Kaneko presented his pitch. Regardless, Kaneko had expressed his support for the project. A figure of the new Gamera will be exhibited at Tamashii Nation 2022 between November 18 and 20, along with a newspaper featuring Gamera that will be distributed at the event.

Filmography

Films

Other media

Home media
In 2003, Alpha Video released the American versions of four Shōwa films on pan and scan DVDs: Gammera the Invincible, Gamera vs. Barugon (as War of the Monsters), Gamera vs. Viras (as Destroy All Planets) and Gamera vs. Guiron (as  Attack of the Monsters).

In 2010, Shout! Factory acquired the rights from Kadokawa Pictures for all eight of the Showa Gamera films in order to release the uncut Japanese versions on DVD for the first time ever in North America. These "Special Edition" DVDs were released in sequential order, starting with Gamera, the Giant Monster on May 18, 2010, followed by Gamera vs. Barugon and two double features: Gamera vs. Gyaos with Gamera vs. Viras, and Gamera vs. Guiron with Gamera vs. Jiger. On March 15, 2011, Shout! Factory released the last two films of the Showa series in a double feature of Gamera vs. Zigra with Gamera: Super Monster. Shout! Factory later released MST3K vs. Gamera, a special 21st volume of Mystery Science Theater 3000 containing the episodes featuring all five Gamera movies from the show's third season.

On April 29, 2014, Mill Creek Entertainment released the eight Showa Gamera films (1965–1980) on Blu-ray in two volumes, Gamera: The Ultimate Collection Volume 1 and Gamera: The Ultimate Collection Volume 2, featuring the original widescreen video and original Japanese audio only with English subtitles, and also the first 11 films (1965–1999) on DVD again as The Gamera Legacy Collection: 1965 - 1999, also featuring the original widescreen video and original Japanese audio only with English subtitles. The Heisei trilogy was re-released on Blu-ray earlier from Mill Creek Entertainment on September 27, 2011, once again featuring the original widescreen video and original Japanese audio only with English subtitles.

On August 17, 2020, Arrow Video released a Blu-ray box set titled Gamera: The Complete Collection. The set features the original Japanese cuts for all 12 films, with English audio options; the Blu-ray debut of Gammera the Invincible and War of the Monsters; digital HD transfers and 4K restorations of the Heisei trilogy; case artwork by Matt Frank; audio commentaries by August Ragone, David Kalat, Steve Ryfle, and Ed Godziszewski; a full color hardcover reprint of Dark Horse Comics' four-issue comic book miniseries Gamera the Guardian of the Universe; the English-language printing debut of the comic book story Gamera: The Last Hope by Matt Frank and Joshua Bugosh; and an 80-page book featuring a retrospective on the series by Patrick Macias with illustrations by Jolyon Yates.

Comics

Dark Horse Comics published a four-issue miniseries based on Gamera called Gamera the Guardian of the Universe in 1996. The miniseries features Gamera, Gyaos, Zigra, and Viras. The manga series Dr. Slump, written and illustrated by Akira Toriyama, depicts Gamera as appearing in the land of Penguin Village. In the manga series Dragon Ball, also by Toriyama, a flying turtle which resembles a smaller version of Gamera is summoned by Master Roshi to carry him to Fire Mountain. There are references to Gamera in chapters of the manga series Kochira Katsushika-ku Kameari Kōen-mae Hashutsujo, written and illustrated by Osamu Akimoto, and Kinnikuman, created by Yudetamago. These chapters appear in Gamera: Super Monster, the eighth film in the franchise.

Television
The third season of Mystery Science Theater 3000 contains five episodes which each feature a film from the Gamera franchise's Shōwa period: Gamera, the Giant Monster, Gamera vs. Barugon, Gamera vs. Gyaos, Gamera vs. Guiron, and Gamera vs. Zigra. In a similar manner to events depicted in the manga series upon which it was based, the anime television series Dragon Ball features a creature known as Baby Gamera, a flying turtle resembling a miniature version of Gamera which transports Master Roshi to Fire Mountain. Gamera was parodied in the South Park episode "Mecha-Streisand", and was featured in the Simpsons episode "Thirty Minutes Over Tokyo".

An anime series, titled Gamera: Rebirth, is scheduled to be released on Netflix in 2023.

Video games
Gamera appeared in several video games released in 1995, including Gamera: Daikaiju Kuchu Kessen for the Game Boy, Gamera: Gyaosu Gekimetsu Sakusen for the Super Famicom, and Gamera: The Time Adventure for the Bandai Playdia. In 1997, Gamera 2000 was released exclusively in Japan for the PlayStation. In 2017, Gamera appeared in the video game City Shrouded in Shadow, released for the PlayStation 4, alongside such characters as Legion, Godzilla, Ultraman, and Evangelion Unit-01.

Reception

Box office performance and critical response
Many of the Gamera films were commercially successful in Japan, rivaling the Godzilla franchise at the box office during the 1960s. However, they were commonly regarded as being inferior to the Godzilla films, with criticism being aimed at the derivative and absurd nature of the series. Despite this, the 1995 reboot Gamera: Guardian of the Universe was both a critical and financial success, remaining in the top 10 films in Japan for its first six weeks of release and grossing more than Godzilla vs. SpaceGodzilla, which was also playing in Japanese theaters at that time.

Legacy
Todd McCarthy, in his review of Gamera: Guardian of the Universe for Variety, wrote that "Despite its horrific countenance and plated shell, Gamera remains one of the most likable of all movie monsters". Brian Solomon of the website Bloody Disgusting ranked Gamera eighth on his list of "Most Kick-Ass Giant Monsters in Movie History". Gamera was also ranked eighth on Rick Mele of Sharp'''s list of "Greatest Giant Monsters in Movie History". Chris Coffel of Film School Rejects wrote that "I would argue that the Gamera franchise is better than the Godzilla franchise", complimenting Gamera's turtle-like design and his affinity for children.

The extinct Cretaceous sinemyidid turtle with long spines on its carapace, Sinemys gamera, classified in 1993, was named after Gamera.

The extinct Cretaceous baenid turtle Gamerabaena sonsalla, classified in 2010, was named after Gamera.

The University of Maryland Gamera I human-powered helicopter, along with its successor, was named after Gamera. Developed by University of Maryland engineering students in 2011 and 2012, respectively, the name was also chosen in reference to the university's mascot, the diamondback terrapin, as well as to flights undertaken by Japanese human-powered helicopters years prior.

In July 2011, Washington State University veterinarians successfully fixed a prosthetic caster onto an African spurred tortoise named Gamera (after the giant turtle), who was a single amputee.

Notes

References

Sources

 
 
 
 
 
 
 
 
 
 
 
 
 
 
 
 
 
 
 

External links
 Official Gamera: Rebirth website by Kadokawa
 The Shrine of Gamera''

Kaiju
Film characters introduced in 1965
Fictional monsters
Fictional Atlanteans
Fictional mutants
Fictional turtles
Kadokawa Dwango franchises
Japan in fiction
Science fiction film characters
Fantasy film characters
Fictional characters with superhuman strength
Fictional cryonically preserved characters
Fictional suicides
Films adapted into comics
Films about children
Fire-breathing monsters